Class D14 on the Pennsylvania Railroad was a type of steam locomotive with a 4-4-0 wheel arrangement in the Whyte notation.
They were originally designated class P in the PRR's pre-1895 classification scheme.  Twenty-two locomotives were built at the PRR's Altoona Works (now owned by Norfolk Southern); six in 1893 with  driving wheels, and sixteen in 1894 with  drivers, classified D14a.
Later, all sixteen class D14a were rebuilt to class D14b with  drivers for secondary service after they were replaced in top-flight express service, while three of the six class D14 were similarly rebuilt to class D14c.

Preservation 

None of the D14’s survived to preservation All were scrapped from 1905-1955 with none preserved.

References

4-4-0 locomotives
D14
Railway locomotives introduced in 1893
Scrapped locomotives
Standard gauge locomotives of the United States